Caloptilia heringi is a moth of the family Gracillariidae. It is known from Japan (Hokkaidō) and the Russian Far East.

The wingspan is 11.5–13 mm.

The larvae feed on Acer mono. They probably mine the leaves of their host plant.

Etymology
The name of the species is dedicated to Prof. Dr. E. M. Hering of Berlin, leading authority of the leaf-mining insects.

References

heringi
Moths of Asia
Moths described in 1966
Moths of Japan